Matt Shirvington (born 25 October 1978) is an Australian athlete and television presenter who held the Australian 100m national sprint title from 1998 to 2002. Shirvington is the third fastest Australian sprinter of all time. He qualified for the 100m semi-finals in Sydney 2000, finishing 5th.

Shirvington is currently a sport presenter on Seven News Sydney.

Athletics
Shirvington generally competed in the 100m, 200m and 4 x 100m relay events, finding the most success in the 100m sprint. He competed in the 2000 Olympic Games, the Athletics World Championships from 1999 to 2007 and the Commonwealth Games in 1998 and 2006.

From 1998 Shirvington claimed five consecutive Australian national titles for the 100m sprint event. At the 1998 Commonwealth Games in Kuala Lumpur, he broke the Australian national 100m record, finishing fourth in the final with a time of 10.03 seconds. Shirvington held the record until Patrick Johnson recorded 9.93 seconds in 2003. He also featured in two World Indoor Championships 60m finals.

Television

Seven Network 
In 2004, Shirvington was a contestant in the first series of Dancing with the Stars and in 2005 was a presenter and reporter on Beyond Tomorrow

In July 2020, Shirvington joined the Seven Network as weekend sport presenter on Seven News Sydney, replacing Jim Wilson. He is also a fill-in host and sports presenter on Sunrise and host of The Morning Show.

On 1 February 2021, Shirvington started hosting the competition series Holey Moley, and on 7 March 2021 he started hosting the competition series Ultimate Tag.

In January 2022, Seven Network announced that Shirvington will join as a host on Sydney Weekender, replacing the long running host Mike Whitney. In July 2022, Shirvington was part of the commentary team for the network's coverage of the 2022 Commonwealth Games in Birmingham.

In January 2023, Seven Network announced that Sam Mac will replace Shirvington as host of the show. Shirvington will concentrate on his growing Seven News and Seven Sport commitments.

Sky News Australia and Foxtel 
In June 2010, Shirvington joined Sky News Australia as a sports presenter.  In 2013, Matt was announced as the new host of the Fox Sports NRL coverage and joined The Back Page as a co-host. In 2014, he co-hosted the ASTRA Awards with Shaynna Blaze. Shirvington has previously been the host of Friday Night Football on Fox League.

Other 
In 2009, Matt had a cameo and one line in the third episode of :30 Seconds.

Shirvington appeared in a guest role on the Australian version of The Biggest Loser in 2010.

Links with NRL clubs

St George Illawarra Dragons
In the 2012 NRL pre-season, Shirvington was appointed a sprint training coach for the St George Illawarra Dragons despite being a fan of the Manly-Warringah Sea Eagles.

Manly-Warringah Sea Eagles
In the 2016 NRL pre-season, Shirvington signed up as a Sea Eagles member and recorded a video message encouraging other Manly supporters to either renew their membership or to sign up. Shirvington also regularly promotes the Sea Eagles via social media.

Personal life
Raised in Davidson, a suburb of Sydney, Shirvington now spends his time between Sydney and London. He attended St Martin de Porres Catholic Primary School in Davidson. He has also been a National Ambassador for CanTeen, an Australian support organisation for young children living with cancer.

Shirvington is married to author Jessica Shirvington. They have two daughters, and a son.

References

External links

1978 births
Australian male sprinters
Australian television newsreaders and news presenters
Australian game show hosts
Olympic athletes of Australia
People from New South Wales
Athletes (track and field) at the 2000 Summer Olympics
Athletes (track and field) at the 1998 Commonwealth Games
World Athletics Championships medalists
Commonwealth Games medallists in athletics
Living people
Commonwealth Games bronze medallists for Australia
Goodwill Games medalists in athletics
Competitors at the 2001 Goodwill Games
Medallists at the 1998 Commonwealth Games